Health Elementary School is the name of multiple elementary school in the United States of America and Canada:

 Health Elementary School (Kentucky), an elementary school in McCracken County, Kentucky.
 Health Elementary School (British Columbia), an elementary school in Delta, British Columbia.